Dieter Dierks (born 9 February 1943) is a German record producer, sound engineer, music publisher, studio owner and musician. He became well known as producer of the rock band Scorpions who were signed to him between 1975 and 1988. Before that time, he had already successfully established Hamburg-based band Atlantis in the US. Between 1969 and 1975, numerous albums of the "Krautrock" era were produced at Dierks Studio. From 1975 onwards, more and more international artists started booking his state-of-the art sound and TV studios.

Personal life 
Dierks is the son of a Jewish mother and a Catholic father. The latter was an orchestra conductor, violinist, sax player and composer. His mother Ursula ran a grocery store. Dieter Dierks was married twice and has four children with four different women. His second wife, Corina Fortmann is the sister of Swiss composer Thomas Fortmann and for many years she was an instrumental part in building the "Dierks Empire". Their daughter, Dominique Schilling, works in Los Angeles as a film director and screenwriter. Dierks' oldest son, Michael Dierks, is an actor. His oldest daughter from his first marriage, Michaela Dierks, works as a TV and music promoter in Cologne. His youngest son, Julien Freundt, works as a sound engineer, composer, music producer and management assistant at his father's company. Dieter's mother Ursula, who was in charge of the studio catering, died in 1991.

The beginning 

Initially, Dieter Dierks wanted to become a director. He studied theatre arts and afterwards went to a drama school. At the same period of time he also played guitar and bass in various rock bands and started setting up his own studios on his parents' premises in Stommeln. The first studio rooms were built in the attic of his parents' house. With his two re-vamped Revox amateur recording devices Dieter Dierks soon managed to attract many young, creative musicians. Again around that time Dierks formed the band "Hush" together with Tommy Engel who was then the drummer of Cologne-based band Tony Hendrik Five, and additional member Frieder Viehmann. In 1969 the band released the single "Oh! Darling/Schau mir in die Augen" (Bellaphon label #1112). The band's live appearances were known to be rather loud.

Two years later Dierks built a large studio complex in the backyard of his parents' house. Shortly afterwards, the apartment building next door was turned into a hotel for studio guests. This way he had created an "all in one" entity as far as music production was concerned: musicians were able to work and live in the same place – a concept that was unique in Germany at the time. During this phase, in 1969, Dierks produced the successful disco hit Loop Di Love with singer Jay Bastos, which was released in 1971 in the Netherlands, Belgium and Germany. The single enjoyed immense chart success and sold several million copies.

The Krautrock and Electronica era 

In the early seventies Studio 1 became an attraction for a new German generation of musicians of the then flourishing hippie culture. The mixture of countryside ambience and high tech studio equipment appealed to them. The name of the village near Cologne gradually started popping up in German music magazines like Musikexpress, Sounds, the trade magazine Musikmagazin as well as Pop Rocky. The editors of these magazine dedicated full pages to this "sound factory" in Stommeln and its productions.

Dierks Studios – along with the studios of Conny Plank in Wolperath – became the home of the most important Krautrock artists, first generation German rock bands, and electronic pioneers, among them Ihre Kinder, Ash Ra Tempel, Tangerine Dream, Witthüser & Westrupp, Hoelderlin, Wallenstein, Birth Control, Guru Guru, Embryo, Popol Vuh, Bröselmaschine, the politically orientated rock bands Amon Düül and Floh de Colgne as well as Krautrock super group Cosmic Jokers founded by music visionary Rolf-Ulrich Kaiser. They were all flocking to Stommeln in order to have their interpretations of rock music recorded and produced – and to be fed by Dieter Dierks' mother, affectionately called "Mother Dierks". One of the regular clients was Klaus Doldinger with his jazz-rock formation Passport. Their albums Looking Thru (1973), Handmade (1973), Cross-Collateral (1975), and Infinity Machine (1976) were recorded in Stommeln. Their live album Jubilee 1974, a recording of the live show at Rheinhalle, Düsseldorf, was mixed at Dierks Studios.

During those years more than 40 trend-setting albums were produced which considerably elevated the reputation independent German rock and electronic music was enjoying on an international level. Many of those were released on the German labels Pilz, Ohr, and Bacillus, but they were also released in the US, France, Italy, and above all in England. The liner notes almost always featured Dierks Studios and its "sound magician and wizard of tunes" Dieter Dierks as well as a "special thanks" for the creative environment and the great catering by "Mother Dierks" who would cook for the musicians till 2 o'clock in the morning if necessary. Another benefit was the fact that Dieter Dierks had continued fitting his studio facilities with the latest high tech equipment, thus turning them into one of the leading German production sites. Self devised reverb effects, additional experimental instruments like the mellotron, a keyboard that could replay regular tapings of orchestra sounds.

Studio expansion and international clientele 

Around 1972 Dieter Dierks expanded further. In order to enable cost-effective pre-productions, the basement of the studio hotel was turned into three small recording studios and a control room bundled as Studio 2. In late 1973 a lounge called "the canteen" planned to be used as a conference room was built in front of Studio 1 as an annex. Eventually the excellent reputation Dierks Studios enjoyed for being a first class recording location had also spread internationally. The company had become an important economic factor for the small town of Stommeln. Bands would often stay there for months, spend money in the shops and in the evenings go to local restaurants and pubs. Journalists would arrive to take photos and do interviews.

The first international band to come from England was Nektar. Between June and August 1971 this quintet recorded their debut album Journey to the Centre of the Eye in Stommeln. They came back to record the albums A Tab in the Ocean (October 1972), the studio live recording ...Sounds Like This (February 1973) and, Remember the Future which in July 1974 reached No. 19 in the US album charts. At the time this album was considered to be the most successful Dierks production so far. In December 1974 Nektar went back to Stommeln for the last time to record Down to Earth. The album went to No. 32 in the US charts and was awarded gold in February 1975.

In 1974 the first audio recording mobile was added to the company's portfolio. Consequently, live performances of renowned international artists such as Al Jarreau, Fats Domino, Oscar Peterson, Harry Belafonte, Michael Chapman, Ella Fitzgerald, The Platters, Brian Auger, Lou Reed, Nana Mouskouri, Santana or Chicago could be recorded. Thanks to his experience with major international artists, their managements and their record companies Dieter Dierks decided to extend his group of companies by launching his own production and publishing firm, Breeze Music. Dierks succeeded in signing one of Germany's leading rock bands called Atlantis featuring the bluesy-voiced singer Inga Rumpf and to produce them on an international level. He got on a plane to America and managed to convince major label Polygram to send the band on a US tour. Together with US manager Ira Blacker he put together a tour for them. The first show supporting Lynyrd Skynyrd took place in Philadelphia in front of an audience of 20 000. A few years later this network should prove very useful for him in connection with Scorpions.

Scorpions, 1973–1988 

Back in 1973 Dieter Dierks and his wife Corina Fortmann went to a gig at a local sports hall in Essen where they encountered a totally unknown newcomer rock band, Scorpions. Despite the scarce audience Dierks was impressed by the professional attitude of these musicians. After initially being hired by RCA to produce them, in 1976 he succeeded in signing them to his company, Breeze Music. In Trance, the first album Dierks had produced sold three times as much as their previous releases. Continuous work experience abroad as well as a highly successful Japanese tour, financed by Breeze Music, the recordings of which later released as Tokyo Tapes, led to the band being signed to the Mercury label (Polygram) in the US. Bob Sherwood, then president, was a rock fan and was impressed with the skills of this German producer. David Krebs, a music business "big shot" was appointed personal manager for Scorpions. With the backing of Leber Krebs Management, a company which solely looked after huge acts like AC/DC, Aerosmith or Ted Nugent, the door for Scorpions to debut live in the US was opened wide.

The first Mercury album Lovedrive – featuring an eye-catching chewing gum breast cover, still a controversial issue to date – awarded them their first gold disc (more than 500 000 units) in the US and reaching worldwide sales of 1.5 million copies. In Germany they secured a long-term contract with EMI Electrola, which also included territories like South East Asia. This deal provided the opportunity to produce the Hanover-based rock band on an international level. For Blackout Dierks rented a huge mansion in the South of France which provided a cook and featured an outdoor pool and a tennis court to give them a break from the day-to-day studio routine in Stommeln. At the same time, the Dierks' owned recording mobile was parked on the premises and ready to go. However, Klaus Meine developed a throat infection, so the album could not be recorded. It ended up being done at a later stage at Studio 2 in Stommeln after all. The albums Blackout and Animal Magnetism branded Scorpions to be the leading melodic hard rock band. With painstaking efforts Dieter Dierks had not only created a unique sound, but also established Scorpions as a solid brand among the leading hard rock bands.

Their 1984 album Love at First Sting featuring the hit single ballad "Still Loving You" catapulted Scorpions to the then zenith of their career at the time: 2.5 million copies (double platinum) sold in the US, gold and platinum status almost everywhere in Europe as well as in Japan and South East Asia, territories where the band had advanced to become the most popular rock band of all. However the production of this album had also required two attempts: In the spring of 1983 Dieter Dierks had rented ABBA's renowned Polar Studios. Just before production was due to start Herman Rarebell and Francis Buchholz had both fallen ill. Herman brought along Jimmy Bain as substitute and Rudolf got Bobby Rondinelli involved. But the results were not convincing, so the entire album was re-recorded and mixed again at Dierks Studios – this time featuring the original line-up. It was worth the effort. This album contains most of their hits and it became the best-selling Scorpions album of all times. The live album Worldwide Live, released in 1985 was a compilation of highlights of their shows during their world tour.

The eight Scorpions albums of the Dierks era can justifiably be considered to be the essence of the band's work. For Dierks, too – every now and then nicknamed "the sixth member of Scorpions" – these albums were the most successful ones in his career as a producer. While working on Savage Amusement, the last album that was produced in Stommeln, differences in opinion between the band and the producer emerged. As a consequence the production contract was not renewed and the collaboration ended in November 1988. Drummer Herman Rarebell reflected in 2011: "For Scorpions Dieter was the right man in the right place. The more his influence within the band grew the more our record sales increased. This intimacy however also caused contempt because with his growing influence discrepancies between the band members were flaring up. At the end of the day, though, he did manage to soothe all the egos and succeeded in steering the band into one direction."

Further studio expansion and motion picture technology 

Thanks to the success with the Scorpions the company Breeze Music was able to secure long-term contracts with major American and European record labels and music publishing companies. So, the expansion plans were apt to continue. Thanks to Dierks Studios excellent reputation more international top stars were flocking to Stommeln: Ike & Tina Turner, Eric Burdon, War, The Boomtown Rats, Dokken, and Irish rock and blues musician Rory Gallagher. Most of them visited more than once. Gallagher preferred to work during the night and recorded two consecutive albums there. He even started a dart club at the pub next door.

In 1985 Studio 3, the biggest studio complex so far, was built. This facility with its vast space offered enough room for orchestras, choirs and big bands. Thanks to its mobile camera and lighting rigs as well as its highly efficient air conditioning system it was also designed for film and video recordings and conformed to the standard of American mega studios. Since all facilities were connected via a subterranean corridor it was possible to switch around and use the entire technical equipment range of all three studios. At the same time the canteen located between Studio 1 and the studio kitchen was enlarged as well. Deep Purple's keyboardist Jon Lord produced his first solo album Sarabande at Dierks Studios. Meanwhile, major US record companies chose Dierks to produce their artists. Among them were Geffen Records' glam metal band Black 'n Blue, heavy metal rockers Twisted Sister who Dierks produced in New York and Los Angeles for Atlantic Records, and Capitol Records' New York punk avant-garde group Plasmatics. US band Mother's Finest recorded a live album with Dieter Dierks as well, using the audio and video mobile with the mixing being done afterwards at Studio 3. In 1986 the Dierks Studios Mobile 1 – put into action all around Europe to record concerts of renowned artists and having proved to be of good use for live broadcasts of the WDR channel shows Rock Palast and Rocknächte – was replaced with Mobile 2, a unit of almost twice the size. This mobile featured analogue and digital recording devices, a computerised mixing console, a state-of-the-art auditory system and, a big lounge area. In 1991 this mobile studio was used to record a Rolling Stones live album in Moscow and other European cities.

Eventually the studio hotel ended up being too small for long-term international residents. So in 1986 Dierks bought a mansion with huge gardens – suitable for long-term stays – in Bruchstraße, around two kilometres away from the studios. This was a place where musicians could stay in a relaxed atmosphere and enjoy creative breaks during long recording periods.

In 1987, after having finished the Studio 3 expansion, Dierks decided to consolidate the base of his group of companies on a long-term basis by concentrating further on the moving picture side, a division of the company, which had been growing steadily. So far only Studio 3 offered facilities for film and video recording. Therefore, a video recording mobile was needed. With the help of experts, an outside broadcasting unit was bought from Westdeutscher Rundfunk (radio and TV channel), fitted with the latest state-of-the art equipment and transformed into a giant mobile. Dierks Studios' first video unit, Mobile 1, was ready for action in 1988. In 1991 Studio 1 and Studio 2 were completely refurbished and the technical equipment was brought up to date. This enabled simultaneous production processes of equal rank in Studio 3 and Studio 1. 1992 the temporarily disbanded group Accept got back together and produced three more albums for Breeze Music.

During the mid nineties rock music gradually lost its attraction. The meanwhile domineering techno and dance music style came into being. This music no longer needed to be produced in big studios. With the help of computers and electronic devices it could be done in small "living-room-style" studios. The Dierks group of companies adapted itself to this development, and in 1995 added two new hard disc studios, namely Studio 4 and Studio 5. With this new cutting-edge computer technology, an ideal work environment for dance, house and techno music projects had been created.

In 1996 Michael Jackson recorded the song Ghosts at Studio 3, which was released on his Blood on the Dance Floor: HIStory in the Mix album in May 1997 and was later put on the Deluxe Collector Box Set – Limited Edition. At the Stommeln-based studios – on the cover incorrectly credited as "Diederdierk Studio (Cologne, Germany)" – vocals and drum programming were recorded. The collaboration with the King of Pop continued during the HIStory world tour with Dierks recording two shows at the Munich Olympiahalle using twelve analogue cameras as well as six digital ones. One of his two new digital mobile units which had been purchased in 1996 respectively 1997 was used for this job. The units in question were 18 meters long, respectively 21 meters long mobile recording units, transported on elaborate trucks, extensible in width and equipped with the latest digital equipment, picture direction monitors and mixing consoles. With up to twelve cameras on board they were able to record huge events. After the Jackson recordings the units came into action to tape the DOME shows for RTL II TV, the Bravo Supershow, the Sabine Christiansen Talkshow as well as the Pope John Paul II trip to Austria in June 1998. Several mobile units featuring HDTV technology were added to the fleet in 1997. This technology produced extremely high-resolution images by using special cameras and was particularly popular with the technology-affined customers from the US and Japan who tended to order numerous classical recordings. The Kirch Group for example booked these units for the recording of the Wagner Festival in Bayreuth.

In 1997 the former engineering lab and the lobby of Studio 3 were turned into a new video-editing studio (avid room) in order to be capable of handling the numerous mixing and cutting jobs that came in. With its in-house avid editing suite, recorded images could be edited, mixed and processed.

Today, having undergone several stages of restructuring the Dierks Studios group of companies is currently positioned as follows:

The "Edit-Suite" is used as editing and screening room, colour grading, colour matching and colour corrections as well as the restoring of movies... all this can be done in 4K and HD.
Studio 1 will be turned into a 4K screening room sized 100 square meters with a seating capacity for 30 people. This studio, too, provides facilities for restoration work, colour corrections and colour grading.
Studio 3 combines analogue and digital recording technology. For sound analogue recording it is used however with a digital surface/solid state console meets D command – analogue warmth and digital speed go hand in hand.
Studio 4 and 5 are used for dubbing, pre-production respectively song writing and composing. In these studios ideas can be garnered, notes can be outlined, and the results can subsequently get their finishing touches in Studio 3.
Studio 6 and 7 will be made into picture editing and conversion facilities where for example 2D can be transformed into 3D.

New activities beyond music production 

In 1997 Dieter Dierks launched the company Breeze TV GmbH that with its so-called P.O.S. (point of sale) TV was set to promote consumer goods via TV screens installed in retail outlets. In cooperation with economist Hagen Backhaus, Dierks succeeded in securing a long-term contract with the Schlecker drugstore chain, which at the time had more than 8,000 affiliates in Germany, Austria and other countries. The deal involved the constant broadcasting of TV commercials in continuous loops on three screens installed in each outlet. This way the commercials could reach more than two million shoppers in Germany alone. For the Dierks group of companies Breeze TV's activities meant that the supply chain and the service cycle from the production of sound and image carriers to the sale of such, had turned into a full circle.

In 1999 Dierks took out a patent on DVDplus (trademark: DVD [plus]). The DVD [plus] patent is a combination of a DVD with a regular CD, which by bonding enables double-sided play back of the sound and the image carrier. While for example the golden side of the DVD plays a film or a live concert, it plays a soundtrack, a music score or previously unreleased live recordings on the silver flip side. In order to ensure the exploitation of this patent, in 1999 Dieter Dierks managed to secure a deal with the biggest CD and DVD manufacturing equipment producer Singulus Technologies. Sony USA is using the Dierks licence under the trading name of DualDisc. Meanwhile, several national and international top artists have had DVDplus respectively DualDisc products produced, among them Herbert Grönemeyer, Die Toten Hosen, Michael Jackson (a whole box set), Santana, Emerson, Lake & Palmer, Steve Harley, Nightwish, Bruce Springsteen, Destiny's Child, AC/DC (more than 500,000 copies of Back in Black sold in the US alone), Aerosmith, and many others. But also football clubs like Bayern Munich or the film company which released "The Blairwitch Project 2" are using the new format. The DVDplus of said movie sold more than 600,000 copies. So far several million sound image carriers have been produced in total. On the DVDplus website 122 different releases are listed. However, during the process of implementing the format, the fact that different companies often owned the copyright for image and sound, proved to be an impediment.

In 2001 Dierks' group of companies consisted of

the Breeze TV GmbH being the biggest division of the group with its 50 employees covering the areas POS TV, direct marketing, e-commerce and online sales
the video mobile division with its video mobile units 1 – 4, the "film like" and "slomo" van
the recording division with then seven studios, whereby Studio 3 was at the time equipped for super audio (SACD) mixes in 5 channel dolby surround sound
the Breeze Dance Division which succeeded in constantly increasing their artist roster
the production and music publishing companies Breeze Music and
the record label Venus Records which worked on the use of existing repertoire and the production of new compilations placed with major record labels in Germany

Significance 

During his career Dieter Dierks produced more than 70 albums, several of which reached gold or platinum status. Apart from his commercial success this "creative tinkerer" is also prominent thanks to his willingness to try out new things and his knack for technological innovation. In 2013 Christoph Wagner wrote: "Dieter Dierks as well as Conny Plank both made substantial contributions in establishing and consolidating an independent German rock music market. Thanks to the power of their imagination and their creativity these very new sounds were able to emerge. These sounds gave German rock music its own identity. At the same time both their studios served as an artistic medium". US music magazine Rolling Stone described Dierks as "the best heavy metal producer of the world" and as far back as 1974 for the magazine "Der Spiegel" he was already then considered to be "the leading German rock music producer."

Productions 
The role describes Dieter Dierks' share in the productions:
 P = Producer
 E = Engineer
 S = Studio owner
 CO = Content owner
 C = Composer
 AR = Arranger
 ME = Mixing Engineer
 RE = Remix Engineer
 A = Artist

References

External links 

DVDplus International
DVDplus Australia
Dierks Studios (in German)

1943 births
Living people
People from Pulheim
Heavy metal producers
German record producers
German songwriters